Mistress America is a 2015 American comedy film directed by Noah Baumbach. It was written by Baumbach and Greta Gerwig, and stars Gerwig and Lola Kirke. The film was released on August 14, 2015, by Fox Searchlight Pictures.

Plot
College freshman Tracy Fishko is having trouble adjusting to college life at Barnard. She eventually meets and befriends a fellow student, Tony, and even develops a crush on him, but when he begins dating another girl called Nicolette, she feels alone again. On her mother's advice, she contacts her soon-to-be stepsister Brooke, who also lives in New York.

Tracy is immediately entranced by Brooke and her lifestyle. After spending a whirlwind night with her, she pens a short story and submits it to her college's prestigious literary magazine. Tracy continues to spend time with Brooke, who reveals her plans for a small and eclectic restaurant called Mom's after her dead mother; the restaurant is being financed by her partner. Upon returning home one night, however, Brooke finds herself locked out of her apartment and discovers that her boyfriend has withdrawn financial support. With massive bills for the restaurant coming due, Brooke visits a psychic with Tracy. Tracy interprets the psychic's words as meaning that Brooke should ask for the money from her former friend Mamie-Claire, with whom she had a falling-out after Mamie-Claire stole her idea for a business and married her former fiancé.

Tracy has Tony drive her and Brooke to Mamie-Claire's home in Connecticut, with Nicolette joining them to make sure that Tony and Tracy are not having an affair. At Mamie-Claire's home, Brooke and the others crash Mamie-Claire's book party, and Brooke pitches her restaurant to Mamie-Claire, hoping she will invest. Mamie-Claire, who confides to Tracy that she did steal Brooke's T-shirt idea to become rich, insists that she will have to talk to her husband, Dylan. While waiting for Dylan's arrival, Brooke takes a call from her father, who informs her that his wedding with Tracy's mother has been called off.

When Dylan comes home, rather than dismiss Brooke, he asks her to pitch her restaurant. Brooke stumbles, but Tracy, still enthused by the project, helps her to pitch it. Dylan tells Brooke he will give her the money but insists that, rather than invest in it, he will give it to her to cover the debt she will have from dissolving the business. Seeing that Tracy is upset by this, and also the toxic effect the offer is immediately having on Dylan and Mamie-Claire's relationship, Brooke ultimately refuses the money.

Meanwhile, Nicolette, who witnessed Tracy kissing Tony, confronts Tracy about her short story. The entire party reads it, and Brooke becomes offended by the brutal way in which Tracy characterized her. She informs her that they are no longer about to become sisters, as their parents no longer want to marry, and tells Tracy that she will sue. Upset, Tracy, sitting outside the house, takes a hit on the bong that Tony had earlier fashioned from an apple with her initial emblazoned on it, smoking marijuana that he had presumably stolen from Dylan's freezer.

Tracy's story is accepted by the university's prestigious literary society, and for a while she joins the group. Still finding herself unable to fit in, she decides to start her own literary club, inviting both Tony and Nicolette to apply for membership.

Finding herself alone on Thanksgiving, Tracy goes to Brooke's old apartment and finds her packing her things, about to move to Los Angeles. She learns that Brooke was able to cover her debts, as Mamie-Claire gave her what would have been her share of money from the T-shirt business. Brooke also tells her that she has passed the SAT and that she has been accepted into college and is considering going. Tracy invites Brooke to have Thanksgiving dinner with her. The two eat out at a restaurant, as the film concludes with Tracy, as narrator, musing: "Being a beacon of hope for lesser people is a lonely business."

Cast
 Greta Gerwig as Brooke Cardinas
 Lola Kirke as Tracy Fishko
 Heather Lind as Mamie-Claire
 Cindy Cheung as Karen
 Jasmine Cephas Jones as Nicolette
 Matthew Shear as Tony
 Kathryn Erbe as Stevie Fishko
 Michael Chernus as Dylan
 Rebecca Henderson as Anna
 Rebecca Naomi Jones as Party Hostess
 Mickey Sumner as Fake Brooke

Music
The film's musical score was composed by Dean Wareham and Britta Phillips, who had previously collaborated with Baumbach on The Squid and the Whale. A soundtrack album was released on August 14, 2015, by Milan Records.

Release
On January 9, 2015, Fox Searchlight Pictures acquired worldwide distribution rights for the film. Mistress America premiered on January 24, 2015, at the Sundance Film Festival, and was released in the United States on August 14, 2015. The film was released on DVD and Blu-ray in the United States on December 1, 2015.

Reception
The film received positive reviews from critics. Review aggregator website Rotten Tomatoes reports that 81% of 180 critics gave the film a positive review, with an average rating of 7.35/10. The site's critical consensus reads, "Mistress America brings out the best in collaborators Noah Baumbach and Greta Gerwig, distilling its star's charm and director's dark wit into a ferociously funny co-written story." On Metacritic, it holds a 75 out of 100 rating based on 42 critics, indicating "generally favorable reviews". Varietys review from Sundance read "Greta Gerwig shines in a tailor-made role in her and Noah Baumbach's spirited screwball follow-up to Frances Ha."

The central screwball-comedy section set in the Connecticut mansion divided critics. While conceding that the film's ending "resolves things on a basically satisfying, quasi-poignant note," Todd McCarthy in The Hollywood Reporter stated that the "inconsistency of the approach overall, combined with Gerwig's maximum voltage performance, is disconcerting, even off-putting". Amy Nicholson, writing for LA Weekly, praised the casting of the section, and in particular the performance of Heather Lind, but found that the "clumsy" sequence "stops the movie cold". On the other hand, Peter Bradshaw, writing in The Guardian, praised the "outrageously farcical and funny extended sequence." For Nigel Andrews in the Financial Times, the "neo-screwball" sequence exemplified the film's themes of love, art, and betrayal; he called the film "funny, witty, joyous, mischievous and casually profound."

References

External links
 
 
 
 

2015 films
2015 comedy films
2010s buddy comedy films
2015 independent films
2010s female buddy films
2010s screwball comedy films
American buddy comedy films
American female buddy films
American independent films
American screwball comedy films
2010s English-language films
Films about writers
Films directed by Noah Baumbach
Films produced by Scott Rudin
Films set in Connecticut
Films set in New York City
Films set in universities and colleges
Films shot in New York City
Films with screenplays by Greta Gerwig
Fox Searchlight Pictures films
2010s American films